Cornplanter may refer to:

People
 Cornplanter (c. 1750–1836) (Gaiänt'wakê or John Abeel), Seneca war-chief, ancestor of all others with the name
 Edward Cornplanter (1856–1918) (So-son-do-wa), Seneca chief and religious leader
 Carrie Cornplanter (1887–1918) (Teton), Seneca artist, daughter of Edward
 Jesse Cornplanter (1889–1957) (Hayonhwonhish), Seneca artist and author, son of Edward, last male descendant of John

Places
 Cornplanter State Forest, a Pennsylvanian wood
 Cornplanter Township, Venango County, Pennsylvania, United States
 Cornplanter Tract, a now-flooded tract of land in Warren County, Pennsylvania

Streams
 Cornplanter Run (Oil Creek), a tributary of Oil Creek in Pennsylvania

See also
 Corn planter, a planter (farm implement) for maize (corn)